The Crisis of the Tumu Fortress, also known as the Tumu Crisis, or the Jisi Incident, was a frontier conflict between the Northern Yuan and Ming dynasties. The Oirat ruler of the Northern Yuan, Esen, captured the Emperor Yingzong of Ming on September 1, 1449.

Beginning of the conflict

In July 1449, Esen Taishi launched a large-scale, three-pronged invasion of the Ming with khagan Toqtaq-Buqa. He personally advanced on Datong (in northern Shanxi province) in August. The eunuch official Wang Zhen, who dominated the Ming court, encouraged the 22-year-old Emperor Yingzong of Ming to lead his own armies into battle against Esen. The size of Esen's army is unknown. The Ming army of about 500,000 was hastily assembled; its command was made up of 20 experienced generals and a large entourage of high-ranking civil officials, with Wang Zhen acting as field marshal.

On August 3, Esen's army crushed a badly supplied Ming army at Yanghe, just inside the Great Wall. The same day the Emperor appointed his half-brother Zhu Qiyu as regent. The next day he left Beijing for Juyong Pass. The objective was a short, sharp march west to Datong via the Xuanfu garrison, a campaign into the steppe and then a return to Beijing by a southerly route through Yuzhou. Initially the march was mired by heavy rain. At Juyong Pass the civil officials and generals wanted to halt and send the emperor back to Beijing, but their opinions were overruled by Wang Zhen. On August 16, the army came upon the corpse-strewn battlefield of Yanghe. When it reached Datong on August 18, reports from garrison commanders persuaded Wang Zhen that a campaign into the steppe would be too dangerous. The "expedition" was declared to have reached a victorious conclusion and on August 20 the army set out back toward the Ming.

Wang Zhen

Fearing that the restless soldiers would cause damage to his estates in Yuzhou, Wang Zhen decided to strike northeast and return by the same exposed route as they had come. The army reached Xuanfu on August 27. On August 30, the Northern Yuan forces attacked the rearguard east of Xuanfu and wiped it out. Soon afterwards they also annihilated a powerful new rearguard of cavalry, led by the elderly General Zhu Yong, at Yaoerling. On August 31, the imperial army camped at the post station of Tumu. Wang Zhen refused his ministers' suggestion to have the emperor take refuge in the walled city of Huailai, just 45 km ahead.

Esen sent an advance force to cut access to water from a river south of the Ming camp. By the morning of September 1 they had surrounded the Ming army. Wang Zhen rejected any offers to negotiate and ordered the confused army to move toward the river. A battle ensued between the disorganized Ming army and the advance guard of Esen's army (Esen was not at the battle). The Ming army basically dissolved and was almost annihilated. The Northern Yuan forces captured a huge quantity of arms and armour while killing most of the Ming troops. All the high-ranking Ming generals and court officials were killed. According to some accounts, Wang Zhen was killed by his own officers. The Emperor was captured, and on September 3 he was sent to Esen's main camp near Xuanfu.

Aftermath
Esen attempted to use the captured emperor to raise a ransom and negotiate a favourable treaty including trade benefits. However, his plan was foiled in the Defense of Beijing due to the steadfast leadership of the Ming commander in the capital, General Yu Qian. The Ming leaders rejected Esen's offer, appointing Zhu Qizhen's brother as the Jingtai Emperor.

The Ming never paid a ransom for the return of Zhu Qizhen, and Esen released him four years later after securing a weak trade deal. Zhu Qizhen was allowed to return to Beijing after agreeing to give up his claim to the throne, and was kept under house arrest at the Forbidden City. Esen faced growing criticism for his failure to exploit his victory over the Ming and was assassinated in 1455. Zhu Qizhen retook the throne in 1457, after deposing his brother in a military coup.

See also
 Defense of Beijing
Battle of Yehuling
 Battle of the Kalka River

References

Works cited

Further reading
"Cambridge History of China, Volume 7, The Ming Dynasty", edited by Twitchett and Mote, 1988.
Frederick W. Mote. "The T'u-Mu Incident of 1449." In Chinese Ways in Warfare, edited by Edward L. Dreyer, Frank Algerton Kierman and John King Fairbank. Cambridge, MA: Harvard University Press, 1974.
The Perilous Frontier, Chapter 7, 'Steppe Wolves and Forest Tigers: The Ming, Mongols and Manchus', Thomas J Barfield

Battles involving Mongolia
Battles involving the Ming dynasty
Great Wall of China
1449 in Mongolia
1449 in Asia
15th century in China
Conflicts in 1449
Huailai County
Military of Zhangjiakou
History of Zhangjiakou